The United States House of Representatives elections in California, 1946 was an election for California's delegation to the United States House of Representatives, which occurred as part of the general election of the House of Representatives on November 5, 1946. Republicans captured control of Congress for the first time since 1928 due to the extreme unpopularity of President Harry Truman. California was indicative of the results as Republicans gained seven seats, one of which was won by a recently returned WWII veteran named Richard Nixon. Democrats would not regain a majority of the delegation until after the 1958 election.

Overview

Results 
Final results from the Clerk of the House of Representatives:

District 1

District 2

District 3

District 4

District 5

District 6

District 7

District 8

District 9

District 10

District 11

District 12

District 13

District 14

District 15

District 16

District 17

District 18

District 19

District 20

District 21

District 22

District 23

See also 
80th United States Congress
Political party strength in California
Political party strength in U.S. states
1946 United States House of Representatives elections

References 
California Elections Page
Office of the Clerk of the House of Representatives

External links 
California Legislative District Maps (1911-Present)
RAND California Election Returns: District Definitions

1946
United States House of Representatives 
California